Acquisitions of German Fokker D.VII wartime aircraft by Allied countries after the 1918 Armistice has ensured that several examples have been preserved.

America

One war prize was captured in 1918 when it accidentally landed at a small American airstrip near Verdun, France. It was donated to the Smithsonian Institution by the War Department in 1920, and is now displayed at the National Air and Space Museum in Washington, D.C.

Two other American war prizes were retained by private owners until sold abroad in 1971 and 1981. The former is now displayed at the Canada Aviation Museum, in Ottawa, Ontario. The latter aircraft has been painted in Royal Netherlands Air Force markings, and is on display in Militaire Luchtvaart Museum in Soesterberg, Netherlands.

Canada

Of the 22 D.VII aircraft acquired by Canada, one is displayed in the Martin Annex at the Lac-Brome Museum, in the village of Knowlton in Lac-Brome, Quebec. This unrestored Albatros-built example, serial number D.6810/18, is the only surviving D.VII that retains its original, Vierfarbiger four-color lozenge camouflage fabric covering, and is the original source of documentation for the four-color variant of the pre-printed covering.

France

One example of the aircraft sent to France is at the Musée de l'Air et de l'Espace in Paris, France.

Germany

A former Marine Luchtvaartdienst D.VII MLD 20  was discovered in a German barn in 1948. This aircraft is now displayed at the Deutsches Museum in Munich, Germany.

Switzerland

The Swiss Air Force bought several German Fokker D.VII in 1920 and built them under license until 1925. One is on display in the Flieger-Flab-Museum in Dübendorf.

United Kingdom

The example preserved in the Royal Air Force Museum in London has an uncertain early history. It was abandoned in Belgium by retreating German forces in 1918 and is likely to be one of the aircraft that served post-war in the Belgian Air Force. It was one of three that were sold and registered to Belgian civilian owners. In 1938, it was shipped to the United Kingdom and added to the aircraft collection of Richard Nash. Under the subsequent ownership of the Royal Aeronautical Society, it was displayed at various collections and exhibitions after World War 2 before being acquired by the RAF Museum in 1992.

References

Fokker aircraft
Fokker D.VIIs